Deconstructed is an album by the bassist Steve Swallow, released on the Xtra Watt label in 1997.

Reception

The AllMusic review by Scott Yanow states: "This CD by electric bassist Steve Swallow is a major surprise, for his ten originals are essentially bebop, often using chord changes that sound familiar... This rare straight-ahead outing by Steve Swallow sounds fresh, lively, and creative, and it is one of his most rewarding recordings as a leader."

Track listing
All compositions by Steve Swallow.

 "Running in the Family" - 5:10
 "Babble On" - 3:44
 "Another Fine Mess" - 6:48
 "I Think My Wife Is a Hat" - 5:45
 "Bird World War" - 3:20
 "Bug in a Rug" - 6:09
 "Lost in Boston" - 5:00
 "Name That Tune" - 5:39
 "Viscous Consistency" - 6:02
 "Deconstructed" - 5:30

Personnel
Steve Swallow – bass guitar
Ryan Kisor – trumpet
Chris Potter – tenor saxophone
Mick Goodrick – guitar
Adam Nussbaum – drums

References

Steve Swallow albums
1997 albums